Otter Lake may refer to:

U.S.
 Otter Lake (Illinois), a lake in Illinois
 Otter Lake (Michigan), any of several lakes in Michigan
 Otter Lake, Michigan, a village in Michigan
 Otter Lake (Waterford Township, Michigan)
 Otter Lake (Cayuga County, New York), a lake in Cayuga County, New York
 Otter Lake (Arietta, Hamilton County, New York), a lake in Hamilton County, New York
 Otter Lake, New York, a hamlet in Oneida County, New York
 Otter Lake (Oneida County, New York), a lake in Oneida County, New York
 Otter Lake (Elcho, Wisconsin)
 Otter Lake (Washington), within the Alpine Lakes Wilderness

Canada
 Otter Lake (British Columbia), a lake in the Tulameen Valley in the Similkameen Country
 Otter Lake Provincial Park in British Columbia
 Otter Lake, Nova Scotia, a small unincorporated town in Nova Scotia
 Otter Lake (Nova Scotia), any of several lakes in Nova Scotia
 Otter Lake (Otter River), the source of the Otter River, in Kenora District, Ontario
 Otter Lake (Rideau Lakes, Leeds and Grenville United Counties, Ontario)
 Otter Lake (Seguin, Parry Sound District, Ontario)
 Otter Lake, Quebec, a municipality in Quebec
 Otter Lake (Saskatchewan), a lake in Saskatchewan
 Otter Lake Airport in Saskatchewan
 Otter Lake Water Aerodrome in Saskatchewan